Robert Burt (1873 – 1955) was an African-American medical doctor and surgeon in Clarksville, Tennessee. He operated an infirmary and later the only hospital in the city from 1904 to 1916. 

The son of freed slaves, he completed medical school at Meharry Medical College in Nashville, Tennessee, with honors in 1897. He moved to Clarksville, where he set up a practice. Burt initially offered services to the African-American community, but soon served as physician and surgeon to all who needed medical assistance. He was an active member of the community until his death in 1955.

He is remembered as a highly skilled surgeon and community leader; a school and a community center were named in his memory in Clarksville.

References
 http://ww2.tnstate.edu/library/digital/Burt.htm

1873 births
1955 deaths
Physicians from Tennessee
African-American physicians
20th-century African-American people